Yalaz is a Turkish surname. Notable people with the surname include:

 Suat Yalaz (1932–2020), Turkish comic book artist
 Tayyar Yalaz (1901–1943), Turkish sport wrestler

Turkish-language surnames